The list of shipwrecks in 1910 includes ships sunk, foundered, grounded, or otherwise lost during 1910.

January

1 January

3 January

4 January

5 January

6 January

7 January

8 January

9 January

10 January

11 January

12 January

14 January

15 January

16 January

17 January

18 January

19 January

22 January

23 January

24 January

25 January

26 January

29 January

February

1 February

2 February

3 February

4 February

5 February

6 February

8 February

9 February

10 February

14 February

16 February

17 February

19 February

21 February

23 February

24 February

25 February

26 February

27 February

28 February

March

2 March

3 March

5 March

6 March

7 March

8 March

11 March

13 March

15 March

21 March

25 March

28 March

30 March

31 March

April

4 April

7 April

11 April

12 April

15 April

17 April

18 April

19 April

22 April

25 April

29 April

May

3 May

11 May

10 May

13 May

14 May

15 May

17 May

18 May

19 May

20 May

21 May

23 May

24 May

25 May

28 May

30 May

June

1 June

4 June

7 June

8 June

9 June

10 June

11 June

15 June

16 June

18 June

19 June

20 June

21 June

23 June

24 June

25 June

26 June

27 June

Unknown date

July

9 July

10 July

11 July

13 July

14 July

17 July

19 July

20 July

21 July

22 July

25 July

26 July

27 July

28 July

29 July

30 July

August

1 August

2 August

3 August

4 August

5 August

9 August

13 August

14 August

16 August

17 August

19 August

20 August

21 August

24 August

26 August

27 August

28 August

31 August

September

1 September

2 September

3 September

4 September

5 September

6 September

7 September

8 September

9 September

10 September

11 September

12 September

16 September

18 September

19 September

20 September

22 September

23 September

24 September

25 September

26 September

27 September

28 September

29 September

Unknown date

October

1 October

2 October

4 October

6 October

7 October

10 October

12 October

14 October

16 October

17 October

18 October

19 October

20 October

22 October

23 October

26 October

27 October

28 October

29 October

31 October

Unknown

November

1 November

2 November

3 November

4 November

5 November

6 November

8 November

10 November

12 November

13 November

17 November

18 November

21 November

22 November

23 November

24 November

26 November

27 November

30 November

December

3 December

5 December

7 December

8 December

9 December

10 December

12 December

13 December

14 December

16 December

17 December

20 December

21 December

22 December

24 December

25 December

28 December

31 December

Unknown date

References

1910
Shipwrecks
Ship